David Fulton Publishers is a book publisher in the United Kingdom, founded in 1836 that specialises in education. It publishes a portfolio of textbooks for trainee teachers, practical books for classroom practitioners, and research and scholarly books for the international academic community.

This company was acquired by Routledge (part of the Taylor & Francis Group) in 2006.

References

External links
Official website

1836 establishments in the United Kingdom
Book publishing companies of the United Kingdom
British companies established in 1836
Publishing companies established in 1836